Mott 32 is a Cantonese restaurant owned by Maximal Concepts. , Mott 32 has six locations, including Hong Kong, Las Vegas, Vancouver, Bangkok, Singapore, and Cebu.

History
 
The first Mott 32 opened in Hong Kong in 2014. The name comes from the address 32 Mott Street in New York City, the location of the first Chinese grocery store which opened in 1891. In 2017, Mott 32 opened its first North American location at the Trump International Hotel and Tower in Vancouver. In January 2019, Mott 32 opened its Las Vegas restaurant at The Palazzo, with "a menu that pulls from Cantonese, Szechuan, and Beijing cuisines, and incorporates the restaurant's signature dishes." Vogue listed it as 2019's most anticipated restaurant opening in that city. Mott 32 has also added restaurants in Singapore and Bangkok. In 2022, Mott 32 expanded to Cebu, with a restaurant in Nustar Resort & Casino.

Reception
 
The restaurant is known for and has won awards for its interior design. Designed by Joyce Wang, the restaurants feature private dining rooms, Chinese vases, and Victorian chandeliers. It has won several awards including the Tatler 2015 Best Interior Design and Inside Awards 2014, World Interior of the Year Winner.
 
The food at Mott 32 has been described as "traditional but tweaked Cantonese, with inclusions from other regions in China."

See also
 
 The World's 50 Best Restaurants
 List of restaurants in Hong Kong

References

External links
 

Restaurants established in 2014